William Herbert "B. J." Sander (born July 29, 1980) is a former American football punter who played for one year (2005) in the National Football League (NFL) with the Green Bay Packers. He was drafted by the Packers in the third round of the 2004 NFL Draft. He played college football at Ohio State University.

Early years
Sander attended Roger Bacon High School in St. Bernard, Ohio and was a letterman in football. In football, he averaged 43.5 yards per punt as a junior. As a senior, he was a first-team All-Ohio selection. William Herbert Sander graduated from Roger Bacon High School in 1999.

College career
Despite starting just one year at Ohio State University, he won the 2003 Ray Guy Award for the best punter in the nation.

Professional career
He was selected in the third round of the 2004 NFL Draft by the Packers. The following year, he played in NFL Europe, and punted respectably for the first half of the following regular season. However, once the cold weather started in Green Bay, Sander struggled, and ended up near the bottom of the punter rankings.

Sander was released by Green Bay on August 21, 2006. Jon Ryan became the team's primary punter.

On March 5, 2007, the St. Louis Rams signed Sander; they released him on April 21, 2007.

External links
College football career summary from the Ohio State University website

1980 births
Living people
American football punters
Green Bay Packers players
Hamburg Sea Devils players
Ohio State Buckeyes football players
Players of American football from Cincinnati